The 2015 Open Championship was a men's major golf championship and the 144th Open Championship, held from 16 to 20 July at the Old Course at St Andrews in Fife, Scotland. It was the 29th Open Championship played at the course and Zach Johnson won in a four-hole playoff for his second major  title.

World number one Rory McIlroy withdrew prior to the tournament due to an off-course ankle injury; he was the first defending champion absent from the Open in over sixty years, since Ben Hogan opted not to participate in 1954. Masters and U.S. Open champion Jordan Spieth attempted to win a third consecutive major and take over the top ranking. He finished one stroke out of the playoff, in a tie for fourth.	

Inclement weather – which included heavy rain and very strong winds – forced play to be suspended twice, on Friday and Saturday, with the latter having play suspended for nearly most of the day. The third round was held on Sunday and the final round (and playoff) on Monday.

This was also the last Open Championship played under the then present TV deals with the BBC and ESPN each having their swan song. NBC and Sky Sports would take over coverage the following year at Royal Troon.

This was the final Open appearance for five-time champion Tom Watson and three-time champion Nick Faldo who played in his last major championship.

Venue

The 2015 event is the 29th Open Championship played at the Old Course at St Andrews. The most recent was in 2010 when Louis Oosthuizen won his only major title and became the second South African to win an Open Championship at St Andrews (Bobby Locke is the first, having won at St Andrews in 1957).

Previous lengths of the course for The Open Championship (since 1950):

 2010:  
 2005:  
 2000: 
 1995: 
 1990: 
 1984: 

 1978: 
 1970: 
 1964: 
 1960: 
 1955:

Field
Each player is classified according to the first category in which he qualified, but other categories are shown in parentheses.

1. The Open Champions aged 60 or under on 19 July 2015
Mark Calcavecchia (3), Stewart Cink (2,3), Darren Clarke (2,3), Ben Curtis, John Daly, David Duval, Ernie Els (2,3), Nick Faldo, Todd Hamilton, Pádraig Harrington (2), Paul Lawrie, Tom Lehman, Justin Leonard (3), Sandy Lyle, Phil Mickelson (2,3,5,15), Mark O'Meara, Louis Oosthuizen (2,3,5,6), Tiger Woods (2,3,12)

Eligible but did not enter: Ian Baker-Finch, Greg Norman, Nick Price
Rory McIlroy (2,3,4,5,6,7,9,11,13,15) withdrew with an ankle injury.

2. The Open Champions for 2005–2014

3. The Open Champions finishing in the first 10 and tying for 10th place in The Open Championship 2009–2014
Tom Watson
The category was extended from 2010 back to 2009 to enable Watson to make a final Open appearance at St Andrews

4. First 10 and anyone tying for 10th place in the 2014 Open Championship
Victor Dubuisson (5,6,15), Rickie Fowler (5,12,13,15), Jim Furyk (5,13,15), Sergio García (5,6,13,15), Marc Leishman, Shane Lowry (5,6), Graeme McDowell (5,6,15), Edoardo Molinari, Charl Schwartzel (5,6,10), Adam Scott (5,10,13)

5. The first 50 players on the Official World Golf Ranking (OWGR) for Week 21, 2015
Keegan Bradley (11,15), Paul Casey, Jason Day (13), Jamie Donaldson (6,15), Matt Every, Branden Grace, Bill Haas (13), J. B. Holmes, Billy Horschel (13), Thongchai Jaidee (6), Miguel Ángel Jiménez (6), Dustin Johnson (13), Zach Johnson (13,15), Martin Kaymer (6,9,11,12,13,15), Brooks Koepka (6), Matt Kuchar (13,15), Anirban Lahiri (OQS Thailand), Joost Luiten (6), Hunter Mahan (13,15), Ben Martin, Hideki Matsuyama (13), Ryan Moore, Kevin Na (13), Ryan Palmer (13), Ian Poulter (6,15), Patrick Reed (13,15), Justin Rose (6,9,13,15), Webb Simpson (9,13,15), Brandt Snedeker, Jordan Spieth (9,10,13,15), Henrik Stenson (6,15), Brendon Todd (13), Jimmy Walker (13,15), Bubba Watson (10,13,15), Lee Westwood (6,15), Bernd Wiesberger, Danny Willett (6), Gary Woodland (13)

Chris Kirk (13) withdrew with a hand injury.

6. First 30 in the Race to Dubai for 2014
Thomas Bjørn (15), Jonas Blixt, George Coetzee, Ross Fisher, Tommy Fleetwood, Stephen Gallacher (15), Mikko Ilonen, Pablo Larrazábal, Alexander Lévy, Marcel Siem, Marc Warren, Romain Wattel

7. The BMW PGA Championship winners for 2013–2015
An Byeong-hun, Matteo Manassero

8. First 5 European Tour members and any European Tour members tying for 5th place, not otherwise exempt, in the top 20 of the Race to Dubai on completion of the 2015 BMW International Open
Kiradech Aphibarnrat

Alex Norén withdrew with an injury.

9. The U.S. Open Champions for 2011–2015

10. The Masters Tournament Champions for 2011–2015

11. The PGA Champions for 2010–2014
Jason Dufner

12. The Players Champions for 2013–2015

13. The leading 30 qualifiers for the 2014 Tour Championship
Russell Henley, Morgan Hoffmann, Geoff Ogilvy, John Senden, Cameron Tringale

14. First 5 PGA Tour members and any PGA Tour members tying for 5th place, not exempt in the top 20 of the PGA Tour FedEx Cup points list for 2015 on completion of the 2015 Travelers Championship
Steven Bowditch, Charley Hoffman, Kevin Kisner, Robert Streb

15. Playing members of the 2014 Ryder Cup teams

16. First and anyone tying for 1st place on the Order of Merit of the Asian Tour for 2014
David Lipsky

17. First and anyone tying for 1st place on the Order of Merit of the PGA Tour of Australasia for 2014
Greg Chalmers (OQS Australia)

18. First and anyone tying for 1st place on the Order of Merit of the Southern Africa PGA Sunshine Tour for 2014
Thomas Aiken

19. The Japan Open Champion for 2014
Yuta Ikeda

20. First 2 and anyone tying for 2nd place, not exempt, on the Official Money List of the Japan Golf Tour for 2014
Hiroyuki Fujita, Koumei Oda

21. First 2 and anyone tying for 2nd place, in a cumulative money list taken from all official 2015 Japan Golf Tour events up to and including the 2015 Japan Golf Tour Championship
Adam Bland, Liang Wenchong

22. The Senior Open Champion for 2014
Bernhard Langer

23. The Amateur Champion for 2015
Romain Langasque (a)

24. The U.S. Amateur Champion for 2014
Gunn Yang (a)

25. The European Amateur Champion for 2014
Ashley Chesters (a)

26. The Mark H. McCormack Medal winner for 2014
Ollie Schniederjans (a)

Open Qualifying Series

The Open Qualifying Series (OQS) consisted of 10 events from the six major tours. Places were available to the leading players (not otherwise exempt) who finished in the top n and ties. In the event of ties, positions went to players ranked highest according to that week's OWGR.

Final Qualifying

The Final Qualifying events were played on 30 June at four courses covering Scotland and the North-West, Central and South-coast regions of England. Three qualifying places were available at each location. (RQ) indicates a player who had played in Regional Qualifying on 22 June: players with an Official World Golf Ranking were exempt from Regional Qualifying, as was Paul Dunne because he had played at Royal Liverpool in 2014.

Gailes Links – Ryan Fox, Paul Kinnear (a, RQ), Mark Young (RQ)
Hillside – Scott Arnold, Pelle Edberg, Jordan Niebrugge (a)
Royal Cinque Ports – Alister Balcombe (a, RQ), Gary Boyd, Ben Taylor (a, RQ)
Woburn – Robert Dinwiddie, Paul Dunne (a), Retief Goosen

Alternates

To make up the full field of 156, additional places were allocated in ranking order from the Official World Golf Ranking at the time that these places were made available by the Championship Committee. Any places made available after the week 27 rankings issued on 5 July 2015 use these week 27 rankings. Six places were made available on 29 June based on the week 26 rankings.

Francesco Molinari (ranked 43, week 26) 
Matt Jones (67)
Tim Clark (71) – withdrew
David Lingmerth (72)
Harris English (74)
Daniel Berger (75)
Russell Knox (ranked 77, week 27) – replaced Rory McIlroy
Kevin Streelman (80) – replaced Chris Kirk
Hiroshi Iwata (81) – replaced Alex Norén
Richie Ramsay (82) – replaced Tim Clark

Round summaries

First round
Thursday, 16 July 2015

Dustin Johnson posted a seven-under-par 65 on day one to lead by one shot from a group of six golfers. Jordan Spieth was two shots off the lead after carding a 67.	
	

*The last group completed play at approximately 9:36 pm. BST (UTC+1)

Second round
Friday and Saturday, 17–18 July 2015

The first group teed-off at 6:32 am BST on Friday, but heavy rain caused localised flooding and play was suspended at 6:46 am. Restarted at 10 am; later tee times were delayed over three hours . The tee time for the 52nd and last group was delayed from the original 4:13 pm to 7:27 pm. The second round was not completed on Friday and 42 players returned early Saturday to finish their 	
	
Dustin Johnson was the overnight leader on 10-under-par after 13 holes, a stroke ahead of Danny Willett. The day marked the final Open appearance of five-time champion Tom Watson at age 65.	

Play resumed on Saturday at 7 am, with the third round due to start at 11 am. However, play was soon suspended at 7:32 am because a strong wind was moving stationary balls on some of the greens. Because it was a non-dangerous situation, players were allowed to complete the hole they were playing. Dustin Johnson had bogeyed the 14th to move back to 9-under-par, tied for the lead with Willett.

After a delay of several hours, it was decided that only the remainder of the second round would be competed on Saturday, with the third round scheduled for Sunday and the fourth round for Monday. Play finally resumed at 6 pm, a 10½ hour delay, and was completed after 9 pm. The 36-hole cut was at even par 144 and eighty players advanced to the third round.

*The last group completed play Saturday at approximately 9:19 pm.

Amateurs: Dunne (−6), Niebrugge (−4), Langasque (−3), Schniederjans (−2), Chesters (−1), Kinnear (+2), Yang (+6), Balcombe (+6), Taylor (+11)

Third round
Sunday, 19 July 2015

Amateur Paul Dunne was in a share of the lead after the third round along with Louis Oosthuizen and Jason Day. No amateur had led the Open after three rounds since 1927.	

*The last group completed play Sunday at approximately 7:04 pm.

Amateurs: Dunne (−12), Niebrugge (−9), Chesters (−6), Schniederjans (−4), Langasque (−4)

Final round
Monday, 20 July 2015

Marc Leishman carded a 66 in the final round to have the lead in the clubhouse at −15 while the final pairings were beginning their back nine. Zach Johnson then birdied the 18th to also card a 66 and tie the clubhouse lead with Leishman. The second to last group of the round were Jason Day and Jordan Spieth. Day and Spieth both headed to the par-4 16th at −14, one shot back of Leishman and Johnson. Spieth hit a difficult putt to birdie to get to -15, while Day parred. On the famous par-4 17th "Road Hole," an errant approach shot by Spieth resulted in a bogey and he was back at −14. Day was unable to convert a difficult birdie putt and remained at −14 as well. At the 18th, Spieth's approach shot was short, in the "Valley of Sin" below the green; he almost holed the chip for birdie, but settled for par and 274 (−14). Day was left with a  birdie putt to join the playoff, but could not convert and also ended a stroke back at 274.

The final pairing was Louis Oosthuizen and amateur Paul Dunne, who was at even par 36 out, but was four-over on the next four holes, fell out of contention, and tied for thirtieth place. Oosthuizen played a solid round and needed a birdie at 18 to get into the playoff with Leishman and Johnson. His approach shot left him with a  birdie putt, which he sunk. The Open Championship's rules dictated there would be a four-hole aggregate score playoff between Johnson, Leishman, and Oosthuizen. Johnson took the early lead on the first and never looked back, winning by a stroke over Oosthuizen. The win was Johnson's second major championship victory; he won the Masters eight years earlier in 2007.

Final leaderboard

Source:

Scorecard

Cumulative tournament scores, relative to par

Source:

Playoff
This was the ninth four-hole playoff at the Open Championship, first used in 1989. The last playoff at St Andrews was twenty years earlier in 1995.

Johnson and Oosthuizen birdied the first while Leishman bogeyed; Johnson birdied the second and then the routing switched over to the Road Hole (#17), which all three bogeyed.  All three made par at 18 and Johnson won the Claret Jug by a stroke.

Four-hole aggregate playoff on holes 1, 2, 17, and 18

Scorecard

Cumulative playoff scores, relative to par
Source:

Notes and references

External links
St Andrews 2015 (Official site)
144th Open Championship - St Andrews (European Tour)
2015 Open Championship (PGA of America)

The Open Championship
Golf tournaments in Scotland
Open Championship
Open Championship
Open Championship